The Grammy Award for Best Soul Gospel Performance was awarded from 1969 to 1977. In 1978 the award was divided into two new awards, the Grammy Awards for Grammy Award for Best Soul Gospel Performance, Traditional and Grammy Award for Best Soul Gospel Performance, Contemporary.

Years reflect the year in which the Grammy Awards were presented, for works released in the previous year.

Recipients

References

General
  Note: User must select the "Gospel" category as the genre under the search feature.

Specific

External links
 Official site

Grammy Awards for gospel music
es:Anexo:Premio Grammy por Mejor álbum gospel, coro o coros